Minami-Sakurai Station (南桜井駅) may refer to:

 Minami Sakurai Station (Aichi)
 Minami-sakurai Station (Saitama)